Wilfred Smith (18 April 1917 – 4 May 1995) was an English footballer who played as a midfielder for Port Vale either side of World War II. He made 164 appearances for the club in league and cup competitions, and later played for Buxton and Stafford Rangers.

Career
Smith joined Port Vale from Sneyd Colliery in October 1936. He made his Third Division North debut in the 1936–37 season, before playing 21 league games in the 1937–38 campaign. He made 37 appearances in the Third Division South during the 1938–39 campaign. He guested for Nottingham Forest and Southend United during World War II. He returned to The Old Recreation Ground after the war, and featured 27 times in the 1946–47 season. He played only once in each of the 1947–48 and 1948–49 campaigns, and was given a free transfer in April 1950 by manager Gordon Hodgson. He finished his career playing for non-league sides Buxton and Stafford Rangers, before becoming a scout for Portsmouth.

Career statistics
Source:

References

1917 births
1995 deaths
Sportspeople from Hanley, Staffordshire
English footballers
Association football midfielders
Port Vale F.C. players
Nottingham Forest F.C. wartime guest players
Southend United F.C. wartime guest players
Buxton F.C. players
Stafford Rangers F.C. players
English Football League players
Association football scouts
Portsmouth F.C. non-playing staff